Silvio O. Conte National Fish and Wildlife Refuge was established in 1997 to conserve, protect and enhance the abundance and diversity of native plant, fish and wildlife species and the ecosystems on which they depend throughout the  Connecticut River watershed. The watershed covers large areas of Vermont, New Hampshire, Massachusetts and Connecticut. It contains a great diversity of habitats, notably: northern forest valuable as nesting habitat for migrant thrushes, warblers and other birds; rivers and streams used by shad, salmon, herring, the endangered shortnose sturgeon and other migratory fishes; and an internationally significant complex of high-quality tidal fresh, brackish and salt marshes.

The refuge works in partnership with a wide variety of individuals and organizations to provide environmental education, to encourage and support appropriate habitat conservation and management on public and private lands, and to protect additional habitat.

The refuge has three cooperative visitor centers: in Colebrook, New Hampshire; at the Montshire Museum of Science in Norwich, Vermont; and Great Falls Discovery Center in Turners Falls, Massachusetts.

The refuge is named for Silvio O. Conte, a late, longtime member of the United States House of Representatives for Massachusetts who worked to preserve and protect the environment.

Areas

The refuge currently consists of nine units (small tracts) and eight divisions (large tracts):

Connecticut
 Deadman's Swamp Unit -  of wetlands and a riverine sand spit that hosts a federally listed beetle in Cromwell, Connecticut, closed to the public for resource protection. 
 Roger Tory Peterson Unit - Old Lyme, Connecticut, was once part of the estate of author and naturalist Roger Tory Peterson. 
 Salmon River Division -   located in the lower Connecticut River valley at the confluence of the Salmon River and the Connecticut River in Haddam, Connecticut.

Massachusetts
 Third Island Unit - a  island in Deerfield, Massachusetts.
 Honey Pot Unit - a  upland and wetland parcel in Westfield, Massachusetts.
 Wissatinnewag Unit -  on the river opposite the Great Falls Discovery Center in Greenfield, Massachusetts.
 Mt. Tom Unit -  on Mount Tom in Holyoke, Massachusetts.
 Mt. Toby Unit -  at the base of Mount Toby in Sunderland, Massachusetts.
 Fort River Division -  located in Hadley, Massachusetts.
 Mill River Division -  located in Northampton, Massachusetts.
 Westfield River Division -  on Benton Hill Road in Becket, Massachusetts.
 Hatfield Unit -  in Hatfield, Massachusetts.
 Dead Branch Division -  in Chesterfield, Massachusetts.

New Hampshire
 Pondicherry Division -  in Jefferson, Whitefield, and Carroll, New Hampshire
 Blueberry Swamp Division  -  on the Mohawk River in Columbia, New Hampshire

Vermont
 Putney Mountain Unit -  which host a federally endangered plant, northeastern bulrush, in Putney and Brookline, Vermont.

References

External links
Refuge profile
Refuge website

National Wildlife Refuges in Massachusetts
National Wildlife Refuges in Vermont
National Wildlife Refuges in New Hampshire
National Wildlife Refuges in Connecticut
Protected areas established in 1997
Protected areas of Franklin County, Massachusetts
Protected areas of Hampden County, Massachusetts
Protected areas of Middlesex County, Connecticut
Connecticut River
Protected areas of Coös County, New Hampshire
Protected areas of Essex County, Vermont
Protected areas of Windham County, Vermont
Wetlands of Massachusetts
Wetlands of Vermont
Wetlands of New Hampshire
Wetlands of Connecticut
Landforms of Franklin County, Massachusetts
Landforms of Hampden County, Massachusetts
Landforms of Middlesex County, Connecticut
Landforms of Coös County, New Hampshire
Landforms of Essex County, Vermont
Landforms of Windham County, Vermont
1997 establishments in Connecticut
1997 establishments in Massachusetts
1997 establishments in Vermont
1997 establishments in New Hampshire